Senna acclinis, commonly known as rainforest cassia or brush senna, is a species of flowering plant in the family Fabaceae and is endemic to near-coastal areas of eastern Australia. It is a shrub with pinnate leaves and bright golden yellow flowers in groups of two to five and long, narrow seed pods. It is similar to other species of Senna that are environmental weeds.

Description
There is a gland between the lower one to four pairs of leaflets. This species can be mistaken for other introduced Senna species that are environmental weeds.

Taxonomy
Rainforest senna was first formally described in 1863 by Ferdinand von Mueller who gave it the name Cassia acclinis in Fragmenta Phytographiae Australiae. In 1998, Barbara Rae Randell and Bryan Barlow changed the name to Senna acclinis in Journal of the Adelaide Botanic Garden.

Distribution and habitat
Senna acclinis is found in near-coastal areas of New South Wales and Queensland, growing in or on the edges of subtropical and dry rainforests.  The plant is distributed in several subregions, including Barrington, Karuah Manning, Mummel Escarpment, Wyong, and Yengro.

Ecology
Senna acclinis is known to be a pollination plant for several insect species, including native bees and the jack-jumper ant Myrmecia nigrocincta, which has been recorded several times visiting the flowers of S. acclinis. Flowers sprout during springs and summer.

Conservation status
The species has been classed as "endangered" under the New South Wales Government Biodiversity Conservation Act 2016. The main threats to S. acclinis are clearance of habitat for development, introduced and invasive species of weeds, timber harvesting activities, and accidental removal during weed-control programs.

References

acclinis
Endemic flora of Australia
Flora of New South Wales
Flora of Queensland
Endangered flora of Australia
Taxa named by Ferdinand von Mueller
Plants described in 1863